Compound meter may refer to:
Compound meter (water meter)
Compound meter (music)